La Garrovilla is a municipality located in the province of Badajoz, Extremadura, Spain. According to the 2010 census (INE), the municipality has a population of 2490 inhabitants.

References

Municipalities in the Province of Badajoz